Molk-e Mian (also Romanized as Molk-e Mīān, Malek Mīān, and Molk Meyan) is a village in Owshiyan Rural District, Chaboksar District, Rudsar County, Gilan Province, Iran. At the 2006 census, its population was 677, in 192 families.

References 

Populated places in Rudsar County